(), usually shortened to , is a Latin phrase for professional work undertaken voluntarily and without payment. In the United States, the term typically refers to provision of legal services by legal professionals for people who are unable to afford them.

 is also used in the United Kingdom to describe the central motivation of large organizations, such as the National Health Service and various NGOs which exist "for the public good" rather than for shareholder profit, but it equally or even more applies to the private sector where professionals like lawyers and bankers offer their specialist skills for the benefit of the community or NGOs.

Legal counsel

Pro bono legal counsel may assist an individual or group on a legal case by filing government applications or petitions. A judge may occasionally determine that the loser should compensate a winning pro bono counsel.

Philippines

In late 1974, former Philippine Senator Jose W. Diokno was released from prison as a political detainee. He set out as a litigation lawyer to devise a means to combat the Marcos dictatorship and introduced the term "developmental legal aid", which involved lawyers providing pro bono legal services but also providing allowances to their clients, who were normally the urban poor, informal settlers, farmers, and victims of Martial law under Ferdinand Marcos. Diokno set up the Free Legal Assistance Group or FLAG, which is the oldest human rights organization in the country. During martial law FLAG has handled most of the human rights cases against the military police and the administration. Eventually the concept of developmental legal aid has grown and fresh lawyers are required to conduct part-time free legal aid for a considerable amount of time, otherwise called the Community Legal Aid Service (CLAS) Rule. Many developmental legal services are provided by most law firms and NGOs in the Philippines.

South Korea
South Korean lawyers are required to complete at least 30 hours of pro bono work per year; however, the local bar associations can reduce this requirement to 20 hours. Those who have a good reason not to fulfill the requirement may pay to a pro bono fund ₩20,000–30,000 (US$17-26) per hour instead.

United Kingdom
Since 2003, many UK law firms and law schools have celebrated an annual Pro Bono Week, which encourages solicitors and barristers to offer pro bono services and increases general awareness of pro bono service.
LawWorks (the operating name for the Solicitors Pro Bono Group) is a national charity that works with solicitors and law students, encouraging and supporting them in carrying out legal pro bono work.  It also acts as a clearing house for pro bono casework. Individuals and community groups may apply to the charity for free legal advice and mediation, where they could not otherwise afford to pay and are not entitled to legal aid. 
Advocates for International Development, which exclusively brokers international pro bono contributing towards the Sustainable Development Goals, operates from a London base. Many barristers offer pro bono services as a direct response the Legal Aid cuts brought by LASPO 2012, from which they make no profit. The Bar Council has revealed that just under a quarter of the bar offer pro bono; this is 3,486 barristers. Additionally, in 2018, the Bar contributed almost 11,000 hours of pro bono work.

United States
Lawyers in the United States are recommended under American Bar Association (ABA) ethical rules to contribute at least 50 hours of pro bono service per year. Some state bar associations, however, may recommend fewer hours. Rule 6.1 of the New York Rules of Professional Conduct strongly encourages lawyers to aspire to provide at least 50 hours of pro bono service each year and quantifies the minimal financial contributions that lawyers should aspire to make to organizations providing legal services to the poor and underserved. In contrast, other states, such as Illinois, do not have recommended hours, yet require annual disclosure of voluntary pro bono hours and contributions made to pro bono organizations.

The Chief Judge of New York has also instituted a requirement that applicants who plan to be admitted in 2015 and onward must complete 50 hours of pro bono service in order to qualify. All attorneys who register must report their voluntary pro bono hours or voluntary contributions.
 
The ABA has conducted four national surveys of pro bono service: one released in August 2005, 
the second in February 2009, the third in March 2013 and the fourth in April 2018.

The ABA Standing Committee on Pro Bono and Public Service and its project, the Center for Pro Bono, are a national source of information, resources and assistance to support, facilitate, and expand the delivery of pro bono legal help. The ABA Standing Committee also sponsors Pro Bono Week during the week of 23–29 October. The ABA Standing Committee on Legal Assistance for Military Personnel and Section of Litigation jointly sponsor the ABA Military Pro Bono Project, which delivers pro bono legal assistance to enlisted, active-duty military personnel.

In an October 2007 press conference reported in The Wall Street Journal and The New York Times, the law student group Building a Better Legal Profession released its first annual ranking of top law firms by average billable hours, pro bono participation, and demographic diversity.  The report found that most large firms fall short of their pro bono targets. The group has sent the information to top law schools around the country, encouraging students to take this data into account when choosing where to work after graduation.

The American Lawyer compiles, from among its 200 top-rated law firms, those that contributed the most pro bono hours of service during the previous calendar year, publishing the list annually.

The Netherlands 
In the Netherlands, legal services offered without payment are known as pro deo.

Examples within specific legal sectors

In intellectual property 
To help make services related to intellectual property (IP) more accessible, a number of organizations have created pro bono initiatives. These organizations offer support from legal professionals at no cost. The services usually cover the professional fees associated with the related services, but no official fees due to a cost to intellectual property offices.

International efforts 
Established in 2015, the Inventor Assistance Program helps inventors navigate the patent system in their own country and a number of other jurisdictions at no cost. Individual inventors and enterprise must be from a participating country and meet certain eligibility criteria. Applicants apply via the IAP Online Platform.  Current participating countries include Colombia,  Chile, Ecuador, Morocco, Peru, the Philippines, and South Africa. The program is operated by the World Intellectual Property Organization (WIPO). In 2020, the WIPO GREEN reinstated their pro bono legal advice program.

The Inter-American Association of Intellectual Property (offers pro bono services related to intellectual property. Services include applications for copyright, patent, and trademarks, academic training, advice on IP related contracts, and IP related disputes.

The International Trademark Association matches eligible clients facing trademark issues with member attorneys who volunteer to provide services free of charge. The program initially accepted applications in the United States and Latin America and later expanded globally.

The European Union Intellectual Property Office (EUIPO) offers free personalized IP support to small businesses for EU based SMEs. The work is not limited to a specific field of IP but covers virtually all IP aspects and services, including help in filing patents, trade marks, design applications, copyright, plant varieties, geographical indications, trade secrets and domain names, as well as licensing, enforcement, franchising, tech transfer of IP rights or any “other IP matters and disputes”.

National efforts 
In the United States, the Patent Pro Bono Program is a nationwide network of independently operated regional programs that matches volunteer patent professionals with financially under-resourced inventors and small businesses for the purpose of securing patent protection.

In the United Kingdom, a collaboration between local intellectual property organizations called IP Pro Bono offers intellectual property advice and legal support or claimants and defendants in intellectual property disputes.

Outside the legal sector
Corporate pro bono efforts generally focus on building the capacity of local nonprofits or mentoring local businesses.  There are many models that businesses use and tailor to their specific strengths.  They may loan employees, provide coaching and mentoring, complete a service marathon, create standardized team projects, engage in open-ended outsourcing, provide sector-wise solutions, perform general contracting, or work on a signature issue.

Loaned employee
In this model, companies loan a fully trained and paid-for employee to the non-profit organization.  Employees can apply for the difficult, yet coveted opportunity to pursue a pro bono interest by lending their knowledge and experience. They use their workplace skills & knowledge in a hands-on or consulting role to build the non-profit's capacity.

Functional coaching and mentoring
Employees match up with their nonprofit peers, form a relationship, and share functional expertise.  They may connect them with assets for growth or revise their business models.  For commodities and service-based businesses, coaching and mentoring is a fresh way for them to do philanthropy. It builds a stronger market for the businesses by strengthening the local economy and cultivates important skills for the service providers and recipients.

Marathon
An event where people meet up to do pro bono work for many continuous hours.

Standardized team projects
Individuals are placed on teams, each with specific roles and responsibilities. Each project is scoped and structured around a standard deliverable based on the needs of the nonprofit partners.  Team projects are meant as fun team-building activities or as highly competitive competitions to examine leadership abilities in employees.

Open-ended outsourcing
A company makes its services available to a specific number of nonprofit organizations on an ongoing, as needed basis.  Volunteers act in a mentor capacity to fill a non-profit's need.  Often employees use workplace skills to provide services that non-profits do not have the resources to fund.

Sector-wide solutions
A company creates a deliverable pro bono resource that can be applicable to all nonprofits across the sector.  Similar to creating products for consumers, this pro bono model advocates creating products that will be distributed for free or at a greatly reduced cost.   Often these are software or other tech services.

General contracting
An entity coordinates and oversees internal and external resources, promoting cross-sector collaboration to address a specific social problem.  Contracting is generally done in an ad-hoc capacity and by intermediary organizations such as AMAIDI International gGmbH, Common Impact, Points of Light or Taproot Foundation.

Signature issue
Signature issues combine corporate assets with pro bono work to fight social problems.  This is as much a corporate branding initiative as it is an altruistic endeavor.  Pro bono volunteers that come en masse from a company become associated with that cause while combating social issues.

See also

 Charity (practice)
 Legal aid
 Legal clinic
 Professional courtesy
Public Architecture
Public art
 Taproot Foundation
 Volunteer Centres Ireland
 Weiquan movement
World Intellectual Property Organization

Further reading 

 Patrick Wingrove. Young counsel ‘love’ for pro-bono helps firms train and retain. Managing IP. May, 19, 2020

Reference

External links

 American Bar Association's Center for Pro Bono - resources for pro bono delivery and state-by-state listing of pro bono programs
 Pro Bono Québec

Latin legal terminology
Giving
Legal ethics